Chiril is a Romanian-language male given name shared by the following people:

Chiril Gaburici, a Moldovan businessman and former Prime Minister of Moldova
Chiril Lucinschi, a Moldovan politician and businessman, former member of Parliament of Moldova
Chiril Sberea, a Bessarabian politician, member of the Moldovan Parliament (1917–1918)
Chiril Spinei, a Bessarabian politician, member of the Moldovan Parliament (1917–1918)

See also
Kiril
Kirill
Chirilov

Romanian masculine given names